Bengt Ove Kindvall (born 16 May 1943) is a Swedish former professional footballer who played as a striker. He started his career at IFK Norrköping, where he played until he joined Feyenoord in 1966 and became professional. The same year, he won the Guldbollen, as the best Swedish footballer of the year. He is regarded as one of Sweden's greatest ever players. A full international between 1965 and 1974, he won 43 caps and scored 16 goals for the Sweden national team. He represented his country at the 1970 and 1974 FIFA World Cups.

Club career
With Feyenoord he won two national championships as well as the 1970 European Cup. In the final against Celtic he scored the winning goal in extra time. In his five seasons with the club, Kindvall scored 129 league goals in 144 games. He returned to Sweden and Norrköping 1971, where he played for three years, until ending his career in IFK Göteborg.

He was the first non-Dutchman to be named Eredivisie top scorer, doing so in 1968, 1969 and 1971. No other foreigner achieved this until Romário in 1989.

Kindvall earned the Svenska Dagbladet Gold Medal in 1969, in that year, he was named as the fourth best player in Europe.

International career 
Kindvall played 43 games with the national team and scored 16 goals. He participated in the 1970 and 1974 FIFA World Cup, playing a major role in the team's qualification for the former.

Personal life

He is the father of former footballers Niclas Kindvall and Tina Kindvall, and brother of Kaj Kindvall, a radio host.

Career statistics

International 

 Scores and results list Sweden's goal tally first, score column indicates score after each Kindvall goal.

Honours
IFK Norrköping
Allsvenskan: 1962, 1963

Feyenoord

 Intercontinental Cup: 1970
 European Cup: 1969–70
 Intertoto Cup: 1967, 1968
 Eredivisie: 1968–69, 1970–71
KNVB Cup: 1968-69

Individual
Guldbollen: 1966
Allsvenskan top scorer: 1966
Eredivisie top scorer: 1967–68, 1968–69, 1970–71
Ballon d'Or fourth place: 1969 (shared with Johan Cruyff)

References

  Profile
  History of Feyenoord

External links

 

1943 births
Living people
Sportspeople from Norrköping
Swedish footballers
Association football forwards
Sweden international footballers
1970 FIFA World Cup players
1974 FIFA World Cup players
IFK Norrköping players
Feyenoord players
IFK Göteborg players
Allsvenskan players
Eredivisie players
UEFA Champions League winning players
Swedish expatriate footballers
Swedish expatriate sportspeople in the Netherlands
Expatriate footballers in the Netherlands
Footballers from Östergötland County